The Battle of Podu Iloaiei was fought during World War II between the German Wehrmacht and the Soviet Red Army. Historian David Glantz described it as part of a failed Soviet offensive in Romania, and considered it a reaction to the Soviet defeat at the First Battle of Târgu Frumos. While according to the Soviet account, the Red Army successfully repelled a German counter-stroke, according to German accounts, the Germans managed to drive the attacking Soviets back to the positions they held before the battle.

Aftermath 
The region was still in Axis hands. Several months later, it was captured by the Red Army in the Jassy–Kishinev Offensive, from 21–23 August 1944.

Notes 

Explanatory notes

Footnotes

References 

 

Battles involving the Soviet Union
Military history of Romania during World War II
Romania–Soviet Union relations
Battles of World War II involving Germany
Battles and operations of the Soviet–German War
April 1944 events